In the United States education system, School Psychological Examiners assess the needs of students in schools for special education services or other interventions. The post requires a relevant postgraduate qualification and specialist training. This role is distinct within school psychology from that of the psychiatrist, clinical psychologist and psychometrist.

Role of Psychological Examiners in schools 
School Psychological Examiners are assessors licensed by a State Department of Education to work with students from pre-kindergarten to twelfth grade in public schools, interviewing, observing, and administering and interpreting standardized testing instruments that measure cognitive and academic abilities, or describe behavior, personality characteristics, attitude or aptitude, in order to determine eligibility for special education services, placement, or conduct re-evaluation, or occupational guidance and planning. 

The work of the School Psychological Examiners is both qualitative and quantitative in nature. They prepare psychoeducational evaluation reports based on test results and interpretation. Integrated with case history, the evaluation reports should present an accurate and clear profile of a student’s level of functioning or disability, strengths and weaknesses, compare test results with the standards of the evaluation instruments, analyze potential test biases, and develop appropriate recommendations to help direct educational interventions and services in a most inclusive and least restrictive environment. Evaluation reports are framed by laws and regulations applicable to testing and assessment in special education, and must follow school district policies and the codes of ethics applicable to education, special education, and psychological assessment.

School Psychological Examiners also provide psychoeducational interventions such as consultation services, collaboration in behavior management planning and monitoring, and devising social skills training programs in public schools.

Unless additionally trained and licensed, School Psychological Examiners do not offer or provide psychotherapy or clinical diagnostic/treatment services, which are attributions of licensed psychiatrists and clinical psychologists, as provided by law and professional regulations.

Qualifications 
School Psychological Examiners are highly trained and experienced educators who hold a master’s or higher degree in education or school counseling and at least one endorsement in special education. In addition to school district policies, School Psychological Examiners are bound by professional regulations, as well as by the ethical codes of testing and measurement. Other designations for School Psychological Examiners include ‘Educational Examiners’ or ‘Psychoeducational Examiners.’ Designation of this specialty varies among different school districts. 

'Psychometrist,’ from the term psychometrics, is an occupational designation not inclusive of the broader faculties of School Psychological Examiners. Psychometrists deal exclusively with quantitative test administration, do not require coursework beyond the bachelor's level, or licensure by a state department of education. Training of psychometrists is primarily done on-the-job, and their services are valuable in mental health community agencies, assessment and institutional research, or test-producing companies, etc., rather than in K-12 schools.

Graduate Training and Licensure of School Psychological Examiners 
Typical training includes coursework beyond the Master of Education, Master of Science in Education, or Master of Arts in Teaching degrees. Currently, School Psychological Examiners complete the courses required by their state department of education rather than by a prescribed self-contained program of studies.  The coursework is equivalent to an entire Specialist or Doctoral Degree; unfortunately just a handful of institutions of higher education offer this kind of self-standing graduate program. Graduate courses of a psychological nature include:

 Special Education Law  
 Advanced Child and Adolescent Growth and Development 
 Psychology of Students with Exceptionalities 
 Abnormal Child and Adult Psychology 
 Advanced Statistics and Research in Education and Psychology
 Tests and measurements
 Assessment and Evaluation of the Individual
 Individual Intelligence quotient 
 Group  Assessment 
 Diagnostics and Remedial Reading 
 Ethical issues in education and psychological measurement and evaluation reporting
 Methods of Instructing Students with Mild/Moderate Disabilities 
 Methods of Instructing Students with Severe to Profound Disabilities 
 Survey of Guidance and Counseling Techniques
 Practicum for School Psychological Examiners (150 supervised contact hours).

Licensure as School Psychological Examiner demands experience in a special education or school counseling setting, satisfactory completion of the required graduate coursework and practicum, plus a passing score on the 'Praxis II Special Education: Knowledge-Based Core Principles'.  Graduate school recommendation and verification of experience by the employing school district complete the requirements. In addition to the practicum, on-the-job mentoring supervision for at least two school years, sometimes four years, allows the transition from initial licensure to standard professional licensure. An annual professional development plan and ongoing performance-based evaluation ensure 'High Quality' professionalism as required by the No Child Left Behind law and related regulations.

Competencies 

Additionally, high quality School Psychological Examiners exhibit proficiency-level knowledge on: 
 The provisions of the Individuals with Disabilities Act and the Section 504 of the Civil Rights Act and related
 State and federal laws, and all the applicable regulations, policies, and standards pertaining the provision of psychosocial and educational services to disabled individuals 
 Children and adolescents' advanced development and behavior 
 Multicultural factors in attitudes and behaviors
 Analysis and diagnosis of learning problems including special consideration of low incidence populations 
 Integration of knowledge, facts, and theory on classroom environment, psychosocial principles, and test results, to plan for prescriptive instruction, management, and education of students with special needs 
 Focused and methodical psychoeducational evaluation reporting, providing sound and accurate information and research-based remediation recommendations to improve individual student's learning, achievement, and behavioral performance 
 Teamwork and collaboration for the process of staffing with other school professionals and collaborative development of  instructional strategies for students with special needs 
 Provision of assistance with instructional modifications or accommodations, and programming or transition recommendations for the Individualized Education Program (IEP) 
 Accountability for the monitoring and outcome assessment of services and interventions.

Evaluation standards 
Evaluation standards provide guidelines for designing, implementing, assessing, and reporting the psychoeducational evaluation reported by school psychological examiners. The evaluation is informed by professional codes of ethics.
 Standards for Qualifications of Test Users
 Code of Fair Testing Practices in Education
 Standards for Multicultural Assessment
 Standards for Educational and Psychological Testing

See also 

 Educational assessment
 Psychological evaluation 
 Standardized test
 Intelligence quotient
 Individual assessment
 Psychoeducational interventions
 Psychosocial interventions
 School counselor
 Individuals with Disabilities Education Act - IDEA
 Special education
 Individualized Education Program - IEP 
 Section 504 of The Civil Rights Act.

References 

 Geisinger, K. F., Spies, R. A., Carlson, J. F., Plake, B. S. (Ed.) (2007). The Seventeenth Mental Measurements Yearbook.  Buros Institute of Mental Measurements. Lincoln, NE: University of Nebraska Press. 

 Patton, J. R., Kauffman, J. M., Blackbourn, J. M., Brown, G. B. (1991). Exceptional Children in Focus (5th Ed). New York, Macmillan Publishing Company

 Smith, T. E., Polloway, E. A., Patton, J. R., & Dowdy, C.A. (2006). Teaching Students with Special Needs in Inclusive Settings: Idea 2004 Update Edition (4th Ed). New York: Pearson Education, Inc.

Education and training occupations